A Romantic Christmas is the fourth studio album and first holiday album by John Tesh. It was released by GTS Records in 1992. The album peaked at No. 3 on the Billboard Holiday Albums chart, No. 8 on its New Age Albums chart, and No. 50 on the Billboard 200.

Track listing

Track information and credits adapted from the album's liner notes.

Personnel 

Musicians
 John Tesh – grand piano
 Paul Viapiano – classical guitar
 Tim Landers – fretless bass (16)
 Joan Elardo – English horn, oboe
 John Reynolds – French horn
 Charlie Bisharat – violin solo (15)
 Vince Denham – saxophone (16)
 Tim Heintz – arrangements (16)

Orchestra section
 Charlie Bisharat – arrangements 
 John Bisharat – conductor
 Barbara Nahlik – contractor
 Ed Alton and Dave Stone – bass
 Matthew Cooker, Armen Ksadjikian, Sachi McHenry and Ed Willett – cello
 Katie Kirkpatrick – harp
 Brian Dembow, Karie Prescott, John Scanlon and David Stenske – viola
 Charlie Bisharat, Darius Campo, Juliann French, Berj Garobedian, Peter Kent, Maria Newman, Sid Page, Michele Richards, Anatoly Rosinsky, Bob Sanov, Sheldon Sanov and Roger Wilkie – violin

The Paulist Boy Choristers of California (Tracks 5, 9 & 13)
 Carol Foster – choir director 

Joseph Bertolami
Matthew Bertolet
Christian Campos
Timothy Chew
Darren Davies
Hassan Dornayi
Anthony Fournier
Cris Garza
Chris Gough 
Michael Graham
Andrew Henning
Gerardo Hernandez
Eric Hwang
Jay Johnson
Tyler Klein
Theodorus Laksmana
Matthew Lawrence
Andrew Lumsden
Jon McIlinay
Michael Martner
Dante Nakazawa
Dominic O'Connor
Jesse Ramirez
Brian Sanchez
Jordan Ste. Marie
Ricky Valenzuela
Hank Wilkes

Production 
 Concetta Sellecchia Tesh – executive producer
 John Tesh – executive producer, producer 
 Chris Chandler – recording 
 Ross Pallone – recording, mixing
 Chris Bellman – mastering at Bernie Grundman Mastering (Hollywood, California)
 Gib Gerard – production assistant
 Vu Tran – art direction
 Charles William Bush – cover photography 
 Will McKenzie – Make-Up
 Mimi Vodnoy – hair stylist 
 Suzie Bagdadi – hair stylist 
 Ronny Schiff – research
 Jerry Gross – Scripture selection
 Teri Meredyth – piano technician
 Denxyl Feigelson – management
 Richard Gant – publicity

Charts

References

1992 Christmas albums
John Tesh albums